Adarnase IV (died 923) was a member of the Georgian Bagratid dynasty of Tao-Klarjeti and prince of Iberia, responsible for the restoration of the Iberian kingship, which had been in abeyance since it had been abolished by Sasanian Empire in the 6th century, in 888.

The numbering of successive rulers in the early Bagratid period is very confused in that it moves between the different branches of the family. Hence, Adarnase, known as “IV” for being the fourth Adarnase as the prince of Iberia, is also known as “II” as a sovereign of Tao-Klarjeti and “I” as the king of Iberia.

Name  
The name Adarnase derives from Middle Persian Ādurnarsēh, with the second component of the word (Nase) being the Georgian attestation of the Middle Persian name Narseh, which ultimately derives from Avestan nairyō.saŋya-. The Middle Persian name Narseh also exists in Georgian as Nerse. The name Ādurnarsēh appears in the Armenian language as Atrnerseh.

Dynastic strife 
Adarnase was the only son of David I, the prince of Iberia with the Byzantine title of curopalates, who was murdered by his cousin Nasra in 881. As Adarnase was still a minor, the Byzantine emperor – pursuant to the policy of division – appointed as curopalates, not Adarnase, but his cousin Gurgen. Nasra’s subsequent attempt to dispossess Adarnase of patrimonial inheritance was defeated with the help of the Armenian king Ashot I in 888. The victory allowed Adarnase to claim a royal status for him. The historian Valeri Silogava has surmised that Adarnase's crowning as king might have occurred, in a symbolic move, at the ancient Iberian capital of Mtskheta, as suggested by an asomtavruli inscription—probably a 17th-century reinstatement of an earlier epigraph—at the Samtavro Monastery.    

Allied with the resurgent Armenians, Adarnase then launched, from his base in Lower Tao, a policy of expansion. Not being a curopalates and having Armenia's example before him, Adarnase assumed the title of king and subsequently defeated his rival curopalates Gurgen. The Byzantine government adapted itself to the circumstances and, upon Gurgen death in 891, recognized Adarnase as curopalates.

Switching alliances 

Adarnase rewarded Ashot of Armenia’s assistance with steadfast loyalty which continued into the reign of Ashot’s successor Smbat I whom Adarnase aided to win the crown in dynastic struggles in 890 and later joined him against Ahmed ibn-'Isâ of Diyarbakır, the Caliph’s former governor of Armīniya. In turn, Smbat recognized Adarnase’s royal status and personally crowned him in 899. The two men collaborated in defeating, in 904, the Abkhazian king Constantine III, their common relative, who competed with Adarnase for hegemony in Inner Iberia (Duchy of Kartli) and with Smbat in Gogarene (Tashir-Dzoraget). Adarnase captured Constantine and turned him over to Smbat. But the latter, inclined to balance Adarnase’s growing power and extend Armenian influence to west Georgia, freed his captive. This move turned Adarnase against Smbat and the ensuing break and enmity weakened both monarchs: Adarnase was dispossessed by Constantine. Viceroy of Kartli in 904, while Smbat was defeated and tortured to death by Yusuf, a Sajid ruler of Azerbaijan in 914. As a result of these events, Adarnase was relegated to his portion of the Bagratid hereditary lands in Tao. He rebuilt the church of Bana in Tao and made it a bishop's seat.

Family 

Adarnase's wife is not known. He was survived by five children:
David II of Iberia (died 937)
Ashot II of Tao (died 954)
Bagrat Magistros (died 945)
Sumbat I of Iberia (died 958)
Anonymous daughter, married Constantine III of Abkhazia
Probably, an anonymous daughter, married to sparapet Abbas, brother of Ashot I of Armenia.

References 

Bagrationi dynasty of Iberia 
Year of birth unknown
923 deaths
Princes of Iberia
Kings of Bagratid Iberia
10th-century monarchs of Georgia
Kouropalatai